Personal archiving is a branch of archival science and genealogy, focusing on the capture and preservation of an individual's personal papers and other documentary output, generally by the individuals concerned.  It is often related to family history, when family historians are engaged in capturing their own living history to leave as a legacy for future generations.  This branch of family history is allied to the growth in activities such as photograph and record scanning which seeks to preserve materials beyond their original life.

Modern personal archiving is often concerned with digital preservation, especially with collating individual's content from social media websites and ensuring the long-term preservation of this.  This often deals with migration of digital content, as a means of preservation, rather than the tradition tasks of conservation of paper-based records.

Form and motivation
Individuals involved in personal archiving consider all media to be relevant sources as long as this relates to the life, memories and experiences of a person. The majority of material is written, photographic, audio or video in nature. Those experiences can relate to their lives, those of living relatives or ancestors.
Those engaged in this practice also see their life experiences as a potential source of historical and cultural record, as well as being able to re-live those moments personally.  Many see the digital age as bringing an opportunity to leave a richer legacy for future generations.

Examples of personal archives 
Personal archives may not always be in the vein of genealogy. They may not always even be indicative of the individual who created the collection. A personal archive can range massively in content. For example one individual may deem their record collection as a personal archive and then another person may deem their dry-cleaning receipts worthy of retention. One such example of the latter was the actress Vivien Leigh. What will be of interest for research in the future is unpredictable. However, Leigh's laundry receipts provided insight into how mid twentieth century haute couture was preserved and presented in public.

Conducting personal archiving

 Choose an online or offline repository to store memories, experiences and living history, where it will be secured for future generations
 Gather existing material, files, documents, scans, photographs, into one place and decide what you think is worth preserving and naming.
 Choose a categorization or organization method.
 Use preservation safe measures to secure your materials so that they last for posterity.
 Invite other family members to join and add to the archive making a family repository. From materials that you have uploaded you can make interesting representations like timelines, timecapsules photo galleries for yourself and ancestors.
 Begin capturing ongoing material, writing your memories, events and experiences, allowing you to leave a written legacy.

See also
 Digital inheritance
 Death and the Internet

References

Further reading
 
 
  + part 2

Archival science
Oral history
Family history
Digital preservation